Heldburg is a town and a municipality in the district of Hildburghausen, in Thuringia, Germany. The municipality was created with effect from 1 January 2019 by the merger of the former municipalities of Bad Colberg-Heldburg, Gompertshausen and Hellingen. It is situated 16 km south of Hildburghausen, and 18 km west of Coburg.

Heldburg was first mentioned in 837. It lies at the foot of the Heldburg Fortress. In 1993 it became part of the municipality Bad Colberg-Heldburg.

References

Hildburghausen (district)